The Druga Gimnazija (Second Gymnasium) is a Sarajevo gymnasium school in Bosnia and Herzegovina. Located in the central area of Koševo
It enrolls approximately 200 boys and girls annually. Although most of the students are from Sarajevo, the school also attracts students from the region as well as children of international diplomats. The school's approximate number of students is 900. The school offers international and national study programmes.

History
The school was founded in 1905 as an all-male school, but was made coeducational in 1957. As it was common in Yugoslavia, the school was officially named Gimnazija Ognjen Prica, after the national hero and teacher, but today adopts its current name standing for the chronological order of being opened, Druga being the second Sarajevo gymnasium.

Education
The Druga Gimnazija is a certified IB World School, offering MYP and Diploma programmes, making it one of the 3 high schools in Bosnia and Herzegovina offering IB curricula.

Besides IB, the school offers the standard BiH gymnasium Matura programme, with the first two years of core curriculum, and multiples fields of focused study for the final two years. The Druga Gimnazija offers courses in natural sciences, linguistics, social sciences and math. Additionally, the school offers a four-year course focusing on mathematics, physics and computer science.

The students are usually divided into six homerooms per year, each housing about 30 students, randomly (except the MYP) at the start of their tuition, and then sorted later on, based on their chosen field of study; each homeroom has the same class timetable throughout the year (once again, except the IB Diploma programme, to which all the students as well as outsiders have to pass the entrance exam, and have a choice of subjects). This method is commonly used by the BiH Matura programme, but deviates from EU and USA methods.

Notable former pupils 
Dražen Ričl, musician
Emir Kusturica, filmmaker
Mladen Vojičić, musician
Branko Đurić, actor, comedian, director and musician
Zenit Đozić, actor and humorist
Nenad Janković, comedian, musician, composer and actor
Nenad Veličković, prose writer and playwright 
Davor Sučić, musician, composer, film score composer, actor and television director
Srđan Vuletić, filmmaker
Zdravko Čolić, musician
Zlatko Lagumdžija, politician
Zlatko Topčić, screenwriter, playwright and novelist
Ognjen Prica, politician
Slobodan Princip, Partisan fighter
Kemal Monteno, singer, songwriter

External links
 The Alumni/Alumnae Forum
 The official school webpage

Gymnasiums in Bosnia and Herzegovina
Education in Sarajevo
Schools in Sarajevo